Prainea is a genus of trees in the plant family Moraceae that is native to Southeast Asia. It is sometimes treated as a subgenus of Artocarpus. It is dioecious, with male and female flowers borne on separate plants.

Species

Prainea frutescens
Prainea limpato
Prainea microcephala
Prainea scandens

References

Moraceae
Moraceae genera
Dioecious plants